Tympanik Audio was an independent record label, launched in September 2007. Tympanik ceased operating on February 29, 2016.

Catalogue

External links
 Official Site
 
 Interview with Paul Nielsen on Arrhythmia Sound (Feb, 2009)

Electronic music record labels
American independent record labels
Record labels established in 2007